Tortiglioni are a type of pasta, similar to rigatoni but larger and with deeper grooves which spiral around the pasta.

They take their name from the Latin word torquere, meaning "to twist". A tortiglione is a characteristic design from the lathe used in pasta manufacturing, with vertical ridges.

Notes and references 

Types of pasta